Siege of Jerez may refer to:
Siege of Jerez (1261): Castile captures Jerez from the local Muslim ruler
Siege of Jerez (1285): Moroccan siege lifted in face of Castilian relief force